Rollin Brewster Sanford (May 18, 1874 – May 16, 1957) was a U.S. Representative from New York.

Early life
Born in Nicholville, New York to Henry T. Sanford (1840-1897) and Louisa Ann Brewster (c. 1841-1922), Sanford was raised in Albany and graduated from Albany High School in 1893. Sanford graduated from Tufts College in 1897. He received a law degree from Albany Law School in 1899, attained admission to the bar and commenced practice in Albany, New York.

Career
He served as member of the New York National Guard from 1901 to 1906.  In the early 1900s he was a member of the Albany Board of Aldermen. In 1908 Sanford was elected Albany County District Attorney and served until 1914.

Sanford was elected as a Republican to the Sixty-fourth, Sixty-fifth, and Sixty-sixth Congresses, serving from March 4, 1915 to March 3, 1921. He declined to be a candidate for reelection in 1920, and returned to practicing law. From 1921 to 1940 he served as member of the New York State Board of Law Examiners.

Death and burial
In retirement Sanford resided in Loudonville, New York. He died there on May 16, 1957 after being struck by a car. He was interred in Albany Rural Cemetery, Menands, New York, Section 114, Lot 20.

Family
Rollin B. Sanford was the great-grandson of Jonah Sanford.  His son William K. Sanford served as Colonie Town Supervisor from 1950 to 1978.

References

External resources

 Rollin Brewster Sanford at Find A Grave

1874 births
1957 deaths
People from St. Lawrence County, New York
Politicians from Albany, New York
People from Loudonville, New York
Tufts University alumni
Albany Law School alumni
Albany County District Attorneys
New York (state) lawyers
Republican Party members of the United States House of Representatives from New York (state)
Burials at Albany Rural Cemetery
Pedestrian road incident deaths
Road incident deaths in New York (state)